Federal Highway 188 (Carretera Federal 188) is a Federal Highway of Mexico. The highway travels from San Antonio Cayal, Campeche in the northeast to Haltunchén, Campeche in the southwest.

References

188